Glasgow Presbyterian Church, also known as Glasgow Community Museum, is a historic Presbyterian church located at Commerce and 4th Streets in Glasgow, Howard County, Missouri.  It was built in 1860–1861, and is a one-story, brick building with simple Gothic Revival style design elements.  The rectangular building measures 57 feet, 5 inches, by 37 feet, 3 inches, and features a board-and-batten vestibule and a Gothic arcade supported by brick pillars.  It houses a local history museum.

It was listed on the National Register of Historic Places in 1982.

References

External links
Glasgow Community Museum

History museums in Missouri
Presbyterian churches in Missouri
Gothic Revival church buildings in Missouri
Churches completed in 1861
Buildings and structures in Howard County, Missouri
Churches on the National Register of Historic Places in Missouri
National Register of Historic Places in Howard County, Missouri